The 2023 Basque foral elections will be held on Sunday, 28 May 2023 to elect the 12th Juntas Generales of Álava, Biscay and Gipuzkoa. All 153 seats in the three Juntas Generales will be up for election.

Opinion polls

Basque
2023
May 2023 events in Spain